Carnate (Western Lombard: Carnaa) is a comune (municipality) in the Province of Monza and Brianza, in the Italian region Lombardy, located about  northeast of Milan.

Carnate borders the following municipalities: Osnago, Lomagna, Ronco Briantino, Usmate Velate, Bernareggio, Vimercate. It is served by Carnate-Usmate railway station.

Twin towns
 Plaisance-du-Touch, France

References

External links